Płużnica  is a village in Wąbrzeźno County, Kuyavian-Pomeranian Voivodeship, in north-central Poland. It is the seat of the gmina (administrative district) called Gmina Płużnica.

The village has a population of 650.

References

Villages in Wąbrzeźno County